

Peterborough Green Wheel
The Peterborough Millennium Green Wheel is an  network of cycleways, footpaths and bridleways. Designed as part of a sustainable transport system for the city, it was created as part of a Millennium project around Peterborough, England.

The name Green Wheel alludes to the circular nature of the major part of the path, which encircles Peterborough, with cycle route "spokes" leading from this perimeter, which passes through several peripheral settlements around Peterborough, into the city centre, allowing easy transport around the network, much of which required no new construction, instead using or improving already existing cycle routes or roads. The only major new construction for the project was that of a curved cycle bridge over the River Nene near Whittlesey, from where the path can be accessed northwards towards Flag Fen, into the city centre or southwards towards the Ortons. The network is fully signposted. As well as this, three circular pipe tunnels were constructed near Etton village in order to allow the Green Wheel route to pass underneath the A15.

The project also encourages recreational use and has created a sculpture trail, which provides functional, landscape artworks along the Green Wheel route and a ‘Living Landmarks’ project involving the local community in the creation of local landscape features such as mini woodlands, ponds and hedgerows.

The project cost £11 million and was 50% funded by the National Lottery through the Millennium Commission and has also been the winner of many awards including a RIBA award for Architecture in 2003.

Bedford Green Wheel
The Bedford Green Wheel is also a project to build on the existing network of traffic free paths and quiet routes for cyclists and walkers. This network will run around Bedford, England, and includes 'spokes' linking into the town centre. The network will link parks, nature reserves, countryside and homes. This project is part of Bedford Borough Council's Green Infrastructure Plan 2009.

The Cycling Campaign for North Bedfordshire promotes and encourages the use of the Bedford Green Wheel.

See also

National Cycle Network

References

Transport in Peterborough
Cycleways in England
2000 establishments in England
Sustainable transport
Transport in Bedford